Peter Mukhito is the former Inspector General of Police in Malawi. He comes from Chiradzulu District. 
He has gained notoriety for his involvement in interrogating Blessings Chinsinga which began the stand off for academic freedom in Malawi between Chinsinga and President Bingu wa Mutharika. He was also involved in the investigation in the death of Robert Chasowa. Mukhito was also the Inspector General during the 2011 Malawian national protest against President Bingu wa Mutharika, that saw 19 Malawians killed. 

He was President Joyce Banda's first replacement on April 7, 2012 and was replaced by Loti Dzonzi. 

On 10 April 2012, there were claims he committed suicide. He eventually went on a local private radio to dispute the claims.

References

Year of birth missing (living people)
Living people
Malawian civil servants
People from the Southern Region, Malawi